Wu Yanan (born December 8, 1985 in Chuzhou, Anhui) is a Chinese sprint canoeist. She won a gold medal, as a member of the Chinese women's kayak four team, at the 2010 Asian Games in Guangzhou, China, with a time of 1:34.440.

Wu represented China at the 2012 Summer Olympics in London, where she competed in the women's K-2 500 metres. Wu and her partner Zhou Yu narrowly missed out on an Olympic medal in the A-final by almost fourteen hundredths of a second (0.14), finishing behind the Polish bronze-medal winning pair of Karolina Naja and Beata Mikołajczyk, with a time of 1:44.136.

References

External links
 
 
 

1985 births
Chinese female canoeists
Living people
Olympic canoeists of China
Canoeists at the 2012 Summer Olympics
Asian Games medalists in canoeing
People from Chuzhou
Sportspeople from Anhui
Canoeists at the 2010 Asian Games
Asian Games gold medalists for China
Medalists at the 2010 Asian Games